John Dengate (1 October 1938 – 1 August 2013) was an Australian folk singer and songwriter. His songs, mostly but not exclusively humorous and satirical have been recorded by performers including Declan Affley, John Warner, Margaret Walters and Doug Jenner. In addition, he appeared on a number of recorded collections and has produced a two-volume CD, 'Australian Son' on the Shoestring label. He made numerous appearances at folk concerts and festivals including the National Folk Festival.

References

External links
National Library of Australia
Folkloric recording 
John Dengate, national treasure
Vale John Dengate
Tributes
Australian Lives

1938 births
2013 deaths
Australian folk singers
20th-century Australian musicians